The International School of Beijing (ISB) is a non-profit international coeducational day school in Beijing, China. The school was founded in 1980 and offers a dual English and Chinese language program for students from EY to Grade 12.  ISB is recognised by the Beijing Education Commission (BEC) as an independent school for expatriate children.

History 
In the 1970s, a small foreign school was established in Beijing, under the auspices of the United States Liaison Office in Beijing, precursor to the US Embassy. Classes were held in a hallway of a diplomatic apartment compound in Sanlitun, with 8 students and 2 certified teachers.

In 1980, the US Embassy merged its school with those of the British and Australian embassies. The Canadian and New Zealand embassies joined in, and the five nations together formally founded the International School of Beijing. Located on the grounds of the US Embassy, the school provided education for the children of the five founding embassies; eventually, as space allowed, children from other embassies were permitted to enroll. Bound by the strict requirements imposed on diplomatic schools, the founding embassies worked to meet educational needs of the growing expatriate community in Beijing.

In 1988 under new regulations, China's Ministry of Foreign affairs officially registered ISB as a "school for diplomatic children." The campus moved to the Lido complex of offices and housing units, and the school was permitted to accept applications from all expatriate residents of Beijing.

In 1991 ISB became the first school in Beijing to offer the full Diploma Programme of the International Baccalaureate Organization. And in 1997, the school was accredited by WASC (in the United States).

In January 2002, the Beijing Municipal Education Bureau allowed ISB to be restructured as an "independent school for foreign children". The following year, ISB was accredited by the Chinese authority NCCT. It was awarded full accreditation from CIS, NEASC (United States), and again from NCCT (China) in 2007.

In 2014, ISB opened its Futures Academy – an educational model designed to inspire creativity, develop problem-solving skills and effective communication, and encourage flexibility and cooperation. The model facilitates learning opportunities and experiences that cultivate these transferable skills and aims to empower students to take ownership of their learning.

In 2016 ISB opened its Dual-Language program in EY and 4, adding a grade level each year through the elementary school.

ISB completed construction of a detached sports facility in 2017, complete with two pressurized domes with advanced air filtration, providing pollution-free indoor tennis courts and a playing field area.

Campus 
ISB is situated on a  campus in Shunyi district, approximately 30 minutes from downtown Beijing and close to expatriate residential compounds. Two purpose-built sports domes sit side by side over 8,500 square meters. The sport domes have H-14 grade filtration systems. In addition, ISB has four fully equipped gymnasiums (one with a climbing wall); baseball and softball diamonds; two full-sized turf soccer fields; a rugby pitch, running track and 665-seat stadium and an aquatics center with a 25-meter pool and diving boards.

In the main school building are 12 science labs, a student cooking lab, a visual arts wing in the middle and high school, and art studios in elementary school. The performing arts wing consists of a 600-seat theater, Black Box theater, rehearsal space, and studio stage. The main school building also has two library-media centers with more than 82,000 volumes and over 160 magazine subscriptions. ISB supports a one-to-one MacBook laptop program for each student in grades 2 through 12.

In 2020 the ISB opened four new facilities: an early years learning center, an elementary school arts and theater, middle and high school performing arts center, and a middle and high school art and design center.

Organization
ISB is a non-profit school governed by a 12-member Board of Trustees. These 12 volunteers are responsible for setting and approving school policy, overseeing ISB's financial status, recruiting, supporting and evaluating the Head of School and guiding strategic direction of the school, and sets goals to fulfill its responsibilities and establishes standing committees to manage its work.

The majority of ISB's income (95%) comes from tuition and capital fees, with bus fees, interest income and grants making up the remainder.

Student and teacher body 
As of the 2021–22 school year, ISB had 1,710 students originating from more than 50 countries and 35 nationalities. There are 723, 435, 447 students in elementary school, middle school, and high school, respectively. ISB is not permitted to take Mainland Chinese students without foreign passports because it is a "school for foreign personnel".

There is high turnover in the study body since many students have parents reassigned by their employers from Beijing to other cities in their jobs and vice versa. Each year the school has roughly 350 new students and 160 students graduate, although there is a 20% rate of application success.

ISB has 420 members of the staff, 212 of which are teachers. The faculty come from a wide variety of countries, including China, The Philippines, South Korea, Ecuador, Ireland, Canada, America, U.K., Australia, Thailand, Singapore, Albania, New Zealand, France, South Africa, Japan, India, Netherlands, Ukraine, Zimbabwe, Germany, Spain, Argentina, Samoa, and Burundi.

Student life
Among the activities offered at ISB are band, orchestra, jazz band, choir, dance, forensics and drama. The high school also has its own honour choir, named "Impromptune", theatre group "Thespians". There are two theatre productions per year and a One Act Festival. In terms of the Jazz Band, this little section of the performing arts department has grown over the years and has become quite strong at the school, with great talent in each of the different jazz-related instruments. The AMIS Honour Jazz Festival was held at ISB in October 2010 and 8 ISB students were successful enough to be a part of the festivities. The Fringe Festival, hosted once every year, is to celebrate the arts at the ISB. 

In elementary school, there are activities such as juggling and basketball.  In these activities, students learn new skills and after a few months, put on a show. In 5th grade, students write a script and perform a chapter of the Chinese novel Journey to the West. A variety of new activities are offered in middle school, with elective coming in the 2019–2020 school year.

The International School of Beijing is also the headquarters of the Global Issues Group International Conglomeration, consisting of over 15 Chapter schools in international schools around the world. Further, the Model United Nations is another program that is widely participated in. Students can participate in one of four travelling trips, including BERMUN, THIMUN Qatar, and CISSMUN. The THIMUN organisation is the only Model United Nations program recognised by the United Nations, and the International School of Beijing has been a member of the organisation since its inception. In addition, MUN is a student run program assisted by a teacher advisor, and the ISB MUN Executive Council organises and runs the Beijing International Model United Nations (BEIMUN), the third largest high school MUN conference in Asia, annually. 2017 marked the 25th Anniversary of the BEIMUN conference and it was hosted on the school campus.

ISB also hosts clubs for middle and high school. Clubs at ISB are coordinated and supported by both the Student Council and the ISB Service Council, composed of the heads of each organization with support from three faculty facilitators. Clubs include: Chess Club, Debate, Kids Read, Public Radio, ISB Live, Makers Club, Model United Nations, Roots & Shoots, and Yearbook Design. The high school clubs include: Anime Club, History Club, SABAR Student Anti Bias Anti Racism Club, Aperature, ISB Live, Science Club, Basketball, Machine Learning and Research, Sports Medicine Club, BJ Student Press, Makers Club, STUCO, Blue Fire, Mandel Math, Student Wellness Club, Blue Shift, Mediheal, TESOL, Buddy, MUN, The Break, Business Club, NCC - Nightengale Charity Club, Thespians, Charity Fashion Show, Net Impact, Tri-M, CodeOlympians, Peer Helpers,Tri-M Music, Dear Letterbox, Tutoring Center, Dragon Chef, Prism, Ultimate Frisbee, Draxonic, Psych Club, We for She, Filmism, Regeneron Science Fair, World Scholar's Cup, Global Issues, Research Symposium, Yearbook, GreenKeepers, Robotics, Youth For Africa, Habitat for Humanity, Roots and Shoots.

Athletics
ISB's after-school sports program serves students at all grade levels, with elementary school, middle school and high school teams taking part in most events within ISAC, and the Beijing/Tianjin international school league. Additionally, ISB's high school teams compete in the ACAMIS, China Cup, and APAC organizations, with travel opportunities for various competitions within Asia. The swimming academy is highly competitive and successful, with excellent pool facilities. Elementary school students have many exciting intramural sports events, sports related ASA's as well as the now famous Jedi Juggler and Dribbling Dragons programs. These are complemented by additional opportunities for competition in invitational tournaments within the ISAC organization.

Accreditations
The ISB is accredited with the New England Association of Schools and Colleges (NEASC) in the United States; the Council of International Schools and the International Baccalaureate Organization in Europe; and the National Center for School Curriculum and Textbook Development (NCCT) in China.

ISB is a member of the East Asia Regional Council of Overseas Schools (EARCOS) and the National Association of College Admissions Counselors (NACAC).

Academic reputation 
In 2010 Sarah Leung of the South China Morning Post wrote that ISB was "Recognised as one of the most academically rigorous international schools in Beijing". In 2013 Mike Embley, the headmaster of the British School of Beijing (BSB), stated that ISB, along with BSB and Western Academy of Beijing (WAB), were one of the top three English-language international schools in Beijing, all having long waiting lists. Citing Embley's definition of two lower tiers of Beijing Anglophone international schools which have vacant student spaces, Tristan Bunnell, the author of The Changing Landscape of International Schooling: Implications for Theory and Practice, stated that this was an instance of the idea of "'superior' and 'inferior' schools" shared by teachers and parents.

School governance
ISB is governed by a board of trustees which consists of a 12-member group of volunteer parents, 9 elected by the ISB Association of Parents and 3 appointed to 3 year terms by the current sitting board at time of appointee vacancies.   The ISB board of trustees provides strategic oversight and governance.  Although the board is strategic in nature, its operational responsibilities are in hiring and evaluating the Head of School. Additionally, the ISB board is also responsible for final budget approvals, and have ultimate fiduciary responsibility for the schools financial health.
The ISB Board of Trustees oversee the operation of ISB according to the Association's Bylaws.

All parents with children attending ISB automatically belong to the ISB Association of Parents as long as they have children that are in attendance.

Notable alumni

Joe Alexander – American-Israeli professional basketball player in the Israeli Basketball Premier League
Camille Cheng – Olympic swimmer
Yu Shuran – Figure skater
Dyah Roro Esti Widya Putri - Member of Parliament, Indonesia at the People's Representative Council

See also
Americans in China
Britons in China
Canadians in China

References

External links
 International School of Beijing (ISB)
 U.S. Department of State, ISB Fact Sheet
U.S. Department of State, 2009
 Council of International Schools
 ISB tuition and fees
 

High schools in Beijing
Private schools in Beijing
International schools in Beijing
International Baccalaureate schools in China
Schools in Shunyi District
Association of China and Mongolia International Schools
Australia–China relations
Canada–China relations
China–New Zealand relations
China–United Kingdom relations
China–United States relations